"Goodbye Jimmy, Goodbye" is a song written by Jack Vaughn and performed by Kathy Linden.  It reached #11 on the Billboard pop chart in April 1959.

The song was A Worchester Production and featured the Joe Leahy Orchestra.

The single ranked #85 on Billboard's Year-End Hot 100 singles of 1959.

Other versions
Ruby Murray released a version of the song in the United Kingdom as a single that reached #10 in June 1959 and reached #2 in Norway.
Ruby Wright released a version of the song as a single in May 1959.
The Kaye Sisters released a version of the song in the United Kingdom as a single in April 1959.
Lily Berglund released a Swedish version of the song in Sweden as a single in 1959.
Maureen Evans released a version of the song as the B-side to her 1959 single "May You Always".
Alice Babs released a Swedish version of the song as part of an EP in 1959.
Bente Lind released a version in Norway 1964 (Manu MA 80), later released in Sweden 1972 (Decca F 44571)
Claudine Longet released a version of the song as the B-side to her 1974 single "Who Broke Your Heart (And Made You Write That Song)".
Schytts released a version of the song on their 1975 album, Hålligång 5.

References

1959 songs
1959 singles
Kathy Linden songs
Ruby Wright songs
Lily Berglund songs
Alice Babs songs
Schytts songs
Philips Records singles
King Records (United States) singles